The bicolored antbird (Gymnopithys bicolor) is a species of bird in the family Thamnophilidae. It is found in Honduras south to Panama, western Colombia and Ecuador. Its natural habitat is subtropical or tropical moist lowland forest.

It is dark brown with a white belly and grey and black facial markings.

Taxonomy
The bicolored antbird was described by the American amateur ornithologist George Newbold Lawrence in 1863 and given the binomial name Pithys bicolor.

There are five recognised subspecies:
 G. b. olivascens (Ridgway, 1891) – Honduras to west Panama
 G. b. bicolor (Lawrence, 1863) – east Panama and northwest Colombia
 G. b. daguae Hellmayr, 1906 – west Colombia
 G. b. aequatorialis (Hellmayr, 1902) – southwest Colombia and west Ecuador
 G. b. ruficeps Salvin & Godman, 1892 – central Colombia

The bicolored antbird was formerly considered as conspecific with the white-cheeked antbird. They were split into separate species based on the results of a genetic study published in 2007 that found that the white-cheeked antbird was more similar to the rufous-throated antbird than it was to the bicolored antbird.

Gallery

References
`

Further reading

 Skutch describes the race Gymnopithys leucaspis olivascen which after the split is now Gymnopithys bicolor olivascens.

External links
Xeno-canto: audio recordings of the bicolored antbird

bicolored antbird
Birds of Honduras
Birds of Nicaragua
Birds of Costa Rica
Birds of Panama
Birds of the Tumbes-Chocó-Magdalena
bicolored antbird
Taxonomy articles created by Polbot